Winterham (also called "Ham", according to the USGS) is a mostly rural unincorporated community in central Amelia County, Virginia, United States. It lies along  at the northern terminus of SR 628 (Butlers Road), 3 miles northeast of the town of Amelia Court House, the county seat of Amelia County. Its elevation is 338 feet (103 m) above sea level.

The precise origin of the name Winterham is unclear, but it dates back at least to the mid-1700s; the suffix "-ham" as it is most commonly used in various placenames derives from Scots hame or Old English hām, meaning "home", "estate", or "village". The earliest uses of "Winterham" probably referred not to the town but to the Winterham Plantation, approximately 4 miles northwest, whose manor house and dependencies were added to the National Register of Historic Places in 2002. A post office was established at the town of Winterham by 1853, and by the early 1900s the town was a freight stop on what was then the Southern Railway, originally the Richmond and Danville Railroad. The railroad station and post office have since closed. The railroad track, which parallels US 360 before the highway curves southeastward at Winterham, is still used by freight trains, and is now owned by the Norfolk Southern Railway.

Morefield Mine, one of several mines that have been worked profitably in Amelia County, is located on Route 628 approximately one mile southeast of Winterham, atop an unusually long and thick vein of pegmatite that contains a number of rare minerals. Since its opening in 1929, Morefield Mine has provided mica, feldspar, and gems, many of museum quality, operating intermittently as a working mine, tourist attraction, and sometimes both simultaneously. Amelia County contains some of the most extensive mica and feldspar deposits in Virginia.

References

External links
Amelia County, Virginia, government website
The Plantation Home of Winterham (now a historical bed-and-breakfast and event center)
Morefield Mine, Amelia, VA. The Official Website

Unincorporated communities in Amelia County, Virginia
Unincorporated communities in Virginia